Paul Pensini (born 14 October 1977) is an Australian former rugby league footballer who played for the North Queensland Cowboys in the National Rugby League.

Playing career
An Atherton Roosters junior, Pensini joined the North Queensland Cowboys in 1998. In Round 14 of the 1998 NRL season, he made his NRL debut in the Cowboys' 14–16 loss to the St George Dragons.

In Round 26 of the 1999 NRL season, Pensini scored his only NRL try in an 18–28 loss to the North Sydney Bears. In November 1999, Pensini was a member of Italy's Mediterranean Cup squad, playing in one game, a 14–10 win over France in Avignon.

After four seasons with the Cowboys, Pensini was released at the end of the 2001 season.

Statistics

NRL
 Statistics are correct to the end of the 2001 season

International

References

1977 births
Living people
Australian people of Italian descent
North Queensland Cowboys players
Italy national rugby league team players
Rugby league props
Rugby league players from Cairns